This is a list of marauding terrorist incidents. Marauding terrorist incidents refers to terrorist incidents which occur across multiple sites and perpetrated by the same attacker or group of attackers where firearms are the principle weapon. Not included are car bomb attacks, there is a separate list for attacks using car bombs unless attackers also used firearms in the attacks.  Mass suicide bombings such as the 7 July 2005 London bombings will not be counted either, unless there are firearms used in the attacks.

See also
List of non-state terrorist incidents
List of major terrorist incidents
List of mass car bombings

References

marauding